"Fore Street" is a name often used for the main street of a town or village in Great Britain. Usage is prevalent in the south-west of England, with over seventy "Fore Streets" in Cornwall and about seventy-five in Devon, but it does also occur in some other parts of England and Scotland.

Settlements with a Fore Street in Cornwall

Settlements with a Fore Street in Devon

Settlements elsewhere in the UK with a Fore Street

 
Dorset 
Evershot
Bridport
Hertfordshire:
Hertford
Hitchin 
Old Hatfield
Somerset: 
Chard 
Taunton 
Dulverton 
North Petherton 
Bridgwater
Wellington 
Winsham
Castle Cary
Suffolk
Ipswich
Framlingham
Wiltshire
Ashton Keynes
Trowbridge 
Warminster
Wylye

Other places
Basildon, Essex
Birmingham, B2
Eastcote, London
Edmonton, London
Limehouse, London
City of London, EC2
Glasgow, G14
Hexham, Northumberland
Johnshaven, Montrose
Lower Darwen, Lancashire

Gallery

See also

 High Street
 Street or road name

Sources
Cornwall Council's Interactive Map 
Street Map.co.uk

Geography of Cornwall
Streets by type
Types of streets
Streets in England
Geography of Devon
English toponymy
Street names